Complexity is the behaviour of a system whose components interact in multiple ways so possible interactions are difficult to describe.

Complexity may also refer to:

 Complexity (journal), a scientific journal
 Computational complexity, in computer science
 Computational complexity theory
 Game complexity, in combinatorial game theory 
 Complexity Gaming, an American professional esports organization
 "Complexity", a song by Front Line Assembly from the 1997 re-release of album The Initial Command 
 "Complexity", a song by Eagles of Death Metal from the 2015 album Zipper Down
"Complexities", a song by Daniel Caesar from the 2019 album Case Study 01

See also 

 Complex (disambiguation)
 Complexity theory (disambiguation)